The 2004 UEFA Intertoto Cup football finals (the summer football competition for European clubs that had not qualified for one of the two major UEFA competitions) were won by Lille, Schalke 04, and Villarreal. 

All three teams advanced to the UEFA Cup.

First round

First leg

The game was awarded 3–0 to Khazar Universiteti due to Schwarz-Weiß Bregenz fielding an ineligible player.

Second leg

2–2 on aggregate, Sloboda Tuzla won on away goals rule.

The game was awarded 3–0 to Vllaznia due to Hapoel fielding an ineligible player. Vllaznia won 4–2 on aggregate.

Vardar won 10–2 on aggregate.

Slaven Belupo won 4–2 on aggregate.

Sartid won 11–0 on aggregate.

Marek Dupnitsa won 2–0 on aggregate.

Spartak Moscow won 2–1 on aggregate.

Teplice won 3–2 on aggregate.

Thun won 2–0 on aggregate.

Tescoma Zlín won 4–3 on aggregate.

Khazar Universiteti won 5–1 on aggregate.

4–4 on aggregate, Spartak Trnava won on away goals rule.

Dinamo Minsk won 2–1 on aggregate.

ZTS Dubnica won 4–0 on aggregate.

Gent won 3–1 on aggregate.

Cork City won 4–1 on aggregate.

Vėtra won 4–0 on aggregate.

Odense won 7–0 on aggregate.

1–1 on aggregate, Tampere United won on away goals rule.

Dinaburg won 4–0 on aggregate.

Esbjerg won 7–1 on aggregate.

Second round

First leg

Second leg

Tescoma Zlín won 3–0 on aggregate.

Vėtra won 2–1 on aggregate.

The game was awarded 3–0 to Genk due to Marek Dupnitsa fielding an ineligible player. Genk won 5–1 on aggregate.

Villarreal won 5–0 on aggregate.

Shinnik Yaroslavl won 4–1 on aggregate.

Slovan Liberec won 7–1 on aggregate.

Thun won 7–3 on aggregate.

OFK Beograd won 5–1 on aggregate.

Cork City won 1–0 on aggregate.

Esbjerg won 2–1 on aggregate.

Spartak Moscow won 5–1 on aggregate.

Tampere United won 3–1 on aggregate.

Dinamo Minsk won 4–3 on aggregate.

Spartak Trnava won 3–1 on aggregate.

1–1 on aggregate. Vardar won 4–3 on penalties.

Slaven Belupo won 2–1 on aggregate.

Third round

First leg

Second leg

4–4 on aggregate, Atlético Madrid won on away goals rule.

Nantes won 4–2 on aggregate.

2–2 on aggregate, Genk won on away goals rule.

Hamburger SV won 5–3 on aggregate.

União de Leiria won 6–2 on aggregate.

Schalke 04 won 7–1 on aggregate.

Slovan Liberec won 2–1 on aggregate.

Lille won 4–3 on aggregate.

2–2 on aggregate, Slaven Belupo won on away goals rule.

OFK Beograd won 1–0 on aggregate.

Villarreal won 3–2 on aggregate.

Esbjerg won 5–1 on aggregate.

Semi-finals

First leg

Second leg

Schalke 04 won 6–1 on aggregate.

Lille won 4–1 on aggregate.

União de Leiria won 2–0 on aggregate.

2–2 on aggregate, Slovan Liberec won on away goals rule.

Villarreal won 2–0 on aggregate.

Atlético Madrid won 5–1 on aggregate.

Finals

First leg

Second leg

Schalke 04 won 3–1 on aggregate.

2–2 on aggregate. Villareal won 3–1 on penalties.

Lille won 2–0 on aggregate.

See also
2004–05 UEFA Champions League
2004–05 UEFA Cup

References

External links
Official site
Results at RSSSF

UEFA Intertoto Cup
3